A Christmas Carol is a 1960 British theatrical short based on the 1843 novella by Charles Dickens.

Cast
 Bruce Anderson as Marley's Ghost 
 Stuart Brown as Bob Cratchit 
 John Hayter as Scrooge 
 Gordon Mulholland as Scrooge's Nephew

See also
 List of Christmas films
 Adaptations of A Christmas Carol

References

External links
 
 A Christmas Carol at BFI

1960 films
1960 short films
British Christmas films
Films based on A Christmas Carol
1960s Christmas films
British black-and-white films
1960s English-language films